Yokouma is a village in the Zabré Department of Boulgou Province in south-eastern Burkina Faso. As of 2005, the village has a population of 139.

During the 2012 elections the village had 63 registered voters. A shed in the village was used as the voting station.

"Yokouma" means "Solidarity" in the Bissa language.

References

Populated places in the Centre-Est Region
Boulgou Province